1 Samuel 26 is the twenty-sixth chapter of the First Book of Samuel in the Old Testament of the Christian Bible or the first part of the Books of Samuel in the Hebrew Bible. According to Jewish tradition the book was attributed to the prophet Samuel, with additions by the prophets Gad and Nathan, but modern scholars view it as a composition of a number of independent texts of various ages from c. 630–540 BCE. This chapter contains the account of David's escape from Saul's repeated attempts to kill him. This is within a section comprising 1 Samuel 16 to 2 Samuel 5 which records the rise of David as the king of Israel.

Text
This chapter was originally written in the Hebrew language. It is divided into 25 verses.

Textual witnesses
Some early manuscripts containing the text of this chapter in Hebrew are of the Masoretic Text tradition, which includes the Codex Cairensis (895), Aleppo Codex (10th century), and Codex Leningradensis (1008). Fragments containing parts of this chapter in Hebrew were found among the Dead Sea Scrolls including 4Q51 (4QSam; 100–50 BCE) with extant verses 9–12, 21–24.

Extant ancient manuscripts of a translation into Koine Greek known as the Septuagint (originally was made in the last few centuries BCE) include Codex Vaticanus (B; B; 4th century) and Codex Alexandrinus (A; A; 5th century).

Places 

Gibeah
Hachilah

David spares Saul again (26:1–12)
There are many points of similarity between this narrative and the one contained in 1 Samuel 23:19-24 and 1 Samuel 24:1-22, although the multiple differences prove that these are two separate events.

Points of similarities:
 The report of the Ziphites (1 Samuel 23:19; 1 Samuel 26:1).
 David's camp in the hill Hachilah (1 Samuel 23:19; 1 Samuel 26:1, 3).
 Saul's march with 3000 men (1 Samuel 24:2; 1 Samuel 26:2).
 The urge of David's men to kill Saul (1 Samuel 24:4; 1 Samuel 26:8).
 David's refusal to kill the anointed of Jehovah (1 Samuel 24:6; 1 Samuel 26:9, 11).
 Saul's recognition of David's voice (1 Samuel 24:16; 1 Samuel 26:17).
 David's comparison of himself to a flea (1 Samuel 24:14; 1 Samuel 26:20).

Points of differences:
 David spared Saul's life in a cave at En-gedi; but here in Saul's entrenched camp. # Earlier David has to flee in haste, here he could send spies
 Previously David was saved by the news of Philistines' invasion, here David kept a distance and separated by a ravine 
 In the first event, David cut off a piece of Saul's cloak, whereas here he took away Saul's spear (a symbol of royal office) and water jug (a symbol of life) as Saul was fast asleep in the camp.

Verse 1

Now the Ziphites came to Saul at Gibeah, saying, “Is David not hiding in the hill of Hachilah, opposite Jeshimon?” 
David's return to Maon could be related with some business of Abigail, now David's wife, who may still control some properties in the area. The Ziphites reported David's presence to Saul, probably out of fear that David may attack them for their former betrayal of him. The fact that Saul at that time was in Gibeah and only 'arose' after hearing the report suggests that he did not pursue David any more until being excited by the Ziphites of a good opportunity to ambush David.<ref name=benson>Benson, Joseph. [http://biblehub.com/commentaries/benson/1_samuel/26.htm '’Commentary on the Old and New Testaments. 1 Samuel 26.] Accessed 9 Juli 2019.</ref>

David reproved Abner as Saul acknowledged his sin against David (26:13–25)
After leaving Saul's camp undetected and standing in a safe distance, David berated Abner for failing to protect the king, while also implying to the failure to recognize the king-elect (verse 14). However, Saul did recognize David's voice, and became regretful of his own action to pursue. In view of his decision to leave Israelite territory, David pled with Saul not to 'let his blood fall to the earth' while in exile. This was actually the last time Saul met David, and as they parted for good, Saul gave his final blessings to David.

Verse 20"Now therefore, let not my blood fall to the earth away from the presence of the LORD, for the king of Israel has come out to seek a single flea like one who hunts a partridge in the mountains."''
"Away in the presence of to be Lord": David implied that he would not be able to properly worship the Lord if he left the land of Israel, which he was planning to do (1 Samuel 27:1).

See also

Related Bible parts: 1 Samuel 24, 1 Samuel 25

Notes

References

Sources

Commentaries on Samuel

General

External links
 Jewish translations:
 Shmuel I - I Samuel - Chapter 26 (Judaica Press). Hebrew text and English translation [with Rashi's commentary] at Chabad.org
 Christian translations:
 Online Bible at GospelHall.org (ESV, KJV, Darby, American Standard Version, Bible in Basic English)
 1 Samuel chapter 26. Bible Gateway

26